This page shows the Libyan national football team's record against other nations throughout history.

Results

1953–99

2000–19

2020–39

Libya national football team head-to-head
Last match updated was against  on 19 November 2019

External links
Wildstat

Results